Morningside is a census-designated place (CDP) in Beadle County, South Dakota, United States. The population was 70 at the 2020 census.

Geography
Morningside is located on the east side of the city of Huron, the Beadle County seat. The James River forms the western edge of Morningside and separates it from the center of Huron. An eastern extension of the city borders Morningside to the south. U.S. Route 14 forms the northern edge of Morningside and leads west into Huron and east  to De Smet.

Demographics

References

Census-designated places in Beadle County, South Dakota
Census-designated places in South Dakota